P54 may refer to:

Aircraft 
 Percival P.54 Survey Prince, a British reconnaissance aircraft
 P.Z.L. P.54 Ryś, a Polish heavy fighter design project
 Vultee XP-54, an American prototype fighter aircraft

Vessels 
 , a patrol vessel of the Argentine Navy
 , a submarine of the Royal Navy
 , a patrol vessel of the Indian Navy sold in 2000
 , a patrol vessel of the Indian Navy commissioned in 2013

Other uses 
 Papyrus 54, a biblical manuscript
 Peugeot 408 (P54), a crossover car
 P54, a state regional road in Latvia